Michal Hanek (born 18 September 1980) is a Slovak football coach and a former midfielder.

Career

Club
Hanek began his professional career with MFK Dubnica in the Slovak Corgoň Liga.

In May 2011, he joined Zagłębie Lubin.

International
He was a part of Slovakia national football team.

References

External links
 
 

1980 births
Living people
Sportspeople from Trenčín
Slovak footballers
Association football midfielders
Slovakia international footballers
FC Nitra players
FK Dubnica players
FC Dynamo Moscow players
Czech First League players
AC Sparta Prague players
ŠK Slovan Bratislava players
1. FC Tatran Prešov players
Polonia Bytom players
Zagłębie Lubin players
Kapfenberger SV players
Diósgyőri VTK players
Slovak Super Liga players
Russian Premier League players
Ekstraklasa players
Austrian Football Bundesliga players
Nemzeti Bajnokság I players
Slovak expatriate footballers
Expatriate footballers in Russia
Expatriate footballers in the Czech Republic
Expatriate footballers in Poland
Expatriate footballers in Austria
Expatriate footballers in Hungary
Slovak expatriate sportspeople in Russia
Slovak expatriate sportspeople in the Czech Republic
Slovak expatriate sportspeople in Poland
Slovak expatriate sportspeople in Austria
Slovak expatriate sportspeople in Hungary